Ricardo Sanz may refer to:

 Ricardo Sanz (film producer)
 Ricardo Sanz García (1898–1986), Spanish militant and union leader